Kabam (formerly Watercooler, Inc.) is an interactive entertainment company founded in 2006 and headquartered in Vancouver, BC. with offices in Montréal, QC, San Francisco, CA and Austin, Texas. The company creates, develops and publishes massively multiplayer social games (MMSG's) such as Marvel Contest of Champions and Transformers: Forged to Fight for mobile devices. Before expanding into gaming, Kabam established itself as a social applications' developer with entertainment and sports communities totaling more than 60 million users.
Kabam markets freemium games for mobile devices, and social networking services. The company's previous investors included Alibaba, Canaan Partners, Google, MGM, Intel, Pinnacle Ventures, Redpoint Ventures, Warner Bros. and others.

The company has focused on developing "real games," or games with immersive gameplay mechanics akin to more traditional MMOs with an emphasis on the spending and gambling of virtual currency. In late 2009, Kabam launched Kingdoms of Camelot, one of the first successful strategy games on Facebook, but in June 2010, the number of players began constantly shrinking.

As of April 2015, Kabam announced a shift in its focus to developing AAA mobile games.

History 
Kabam was founded in 2006 as Watercooler by Kevin Chou, Michael Li, Holly Liu, and Wayne Chan, the company started off focused on building community apps for sports and entertainment fans, amassing more than 25 million users on Facebook and other social networks. In October 2009 Watercooler, secured $5.5 million in Series B funding from Betfair, the world's largest Internet betting exchange, and Canaan Partners, which participated in the company's Series A funding in 2007. On November 2, 2009, Watercooler, launched Kingdoms of Camelot on Facebook.

On August 3, 2010, Watercooler changed its name to Kabam.

On September 19, 2012, CEO Kevin Chou announced that Kabam was considering an IPO. A secondary stock sale was agreed at the end of 2013 which valued the company at $700 million, it was also announced at this time that four of its games – led by Kingdoms of Camelot – grossed more than $100 million, with $360 million in revenues for 2013.

In June 2014, Kabam hired former EA Mobile VP Aaron Loeb as Senior Vice President of its North American Studios (San Francisco and Vancouver), while at EA Mobile he worked on The Simpsons: Tapped Out and Monopoly Slots, Kabam hoped he would provide a link to Hollywood Studios. Also in June, Kabam shut down servers for The Hobbit: Armies of the Third Age.

Alibaba announced in July 2014 that it planned to invest $120 million in Kabam, giving the company a $1 billion valuation. This allowed its games to be distributed through Alibaba's apps, including Mobile Taobao and the Laiwang messaging app.

As of April 2015, Kabam is only focused on developing AAA mobile games. As a result, a number of Kabam games were shut down, older Kabam games transferred to other companies and Kabam support for third-party games decreased.

On August 13, 2015, Machine Zone, maker of Game of War: Fire Age, sued Kabam for trade secret theft. The conflict was resolved to both companies' satisfaction a month later on September 10.

On September 10, 2015, Kabam, Disney Interactive, and Lucasfilm released Star Wars: Uprising. In September 2015, Nick Earl, president of worldwide studios, resigned. Mike Verdu was promoted to president of Kabam Studios and chief creative officer in charge of the publisher's game design and game quality. Aaron Loeb was promoted to president of Kabam Studios and live services, in charge of service quality.

On January 7, 2016, Kabam announced it had sold its legacy games and third party-published games to Chinese publisher GAEA Mobile. After the downsizing in April 2015, Kabam shut down a number of older games that were not transferred.

On February 22, 2016, Kabam laid off 8 percent of its company workforce. Kevin Chou, Kabam's chief executive, said in an exclusive interview with GamesBeat that the company will focus on free-to-play massively multiplayer mobile games such as its current hits, Marvel: Contest of Champions and Star Wars: Uprising. That means Kabam will put less emphasis on single-player games such as Fast & Furious.

On June 23, 2016, Kabam announced that they would be selling Realm of the Mad God to DECA Games.

In July 2016, Kabam announces that Marvel Contest of Champions hit $100 million in gross revenue in seven months, the fastest of any game in Kabam history (The Hobbit was next fastest at 13 months). In November 2016, Kabam appoints Jeff Howell to the newly created position, Chief Technology Officer.

In June 2016, Kabam partners with Lightstorm Entertainment and 20th Century Fox to Develop a Groundbreaking New Avatar Mobile Game.

In August 2016, Kabam and Hasbro teamed up to develop Transformers: Forged to Fight. The title was released on April 5, 2017.

In October 2016, Kabam Vancouver announced planning for a new location, TechVibes.

As of March 1, 2017, Kabam was acquired by Netmarble.

In 2017, Tim Fields was named as CEO of Kabam.

On August 17, 2020, Kabam released Marvel Realm of Champions, a spin-off of their hit game Marvel Contest of Champions. That game would go on to shut down on March 31, 2022.

On January 17, 2022, Kabam announced that Mr. Seungwon Lee from Netmarble would assume the role of CEO at Kabam.

Kabam and Disney collaborated to make Disney Mirrorverse, released on June 23, 2022.

Company acquisitions

Games and platforms

Games developed or acquired by Kabam

Games developed by 3rd parties and distributed by Kabam 

Notes:
Release date denotes when a game is first available to play, including closed and open beta releases.
For games that are developed by other studios and distributed by Kabam, the shutdown date is when Kabam discontinued their support of the games. Those games may still be distributed by other publishers, or available to play on servers hosted by companies other than Kabam.

References

External links 
 

Video game companies of the United States
Video game companies of Canada
Mobile game companies
Video game companies established in 2006
Video game development companies